Heinrich Glücksmann (born 7 July 1864, in Rackschitz (part of Moravský Krumlov) – died June 1947, in Argentina) was a Moravian-born Austrian author.

He began his literary career at 16, one of his first productions being "Aufsätze über Frauensitten und Unsitten", which appeared in the "Wiener Hausfrauen-Zeitung" under the pseudonym "Henriette Namskilg" (Other pseudonym is "Fortunatus"). He then became a teacher in the Vienna School of Acting. From 1882 to 1885 he was editor of the "Fünfkirchner Zeitung" (of Pécs), and from 1884 to 1886 held similar positions with the "Neue Pester Journal" and the "Polit'sche Volksblatt" of Budapest.

In 1886 Glücksmann published an illustrated biographical edition of the works of Michael von Zichy, the painter; and in the same year he published a biography of Munkàcsy. Since that time he had been active as a feuilletonist and dramatist.

His bequest is stored in the Theatermuseum in Vienna.

Literary works
His works are:
 Weihnachts-Zauber, drama, 1888 (Christmas Magic)
 Die Ball-Königin, comedy, translated from the Hungarian, 1889 (The Queen of the Ball)
 Wien, literary almanac, 1891 (Vienna)
 Neues Evangelium, drama, 1892 (New Gospel)
 Das goldene Zeitalter des Gewerbes, 1893
 Ungarns Millennium, 1896 (Hungary's Millennium)
 Liebesbrief, translation, 1897 (Love Letter)
 Kreislauf der Liebe, translation, 1897 (Cycle of Love)
 Dr. Idyll, translation, 1897
 Die Bürde der Schönheit, romance, 1897
 Franz Joseph I. und seine Zeit, 1898–1899 (Franz Joseph and His Time)
 Goethe als Theaterleiter, ca. 1906
 Fährten und Narben. Gesammelte Gedichte. 1879 – 1912, München, Georg Müller, 1913
 Victor Kutschera. Dem Doppeljubilar zum 60. Geburtstag u. zu 40jährigem Kunstwirken ... von seinen Kollegen, 1923

Film scripts
 Mozarts Leben, Lieben und Leiden, 1921
 Theodor Herzl (1921)
 aka The Wandering Jew: The Life of Theodore Herzl (USA: informal English title)

References

Bibliography of Jewish Encyclopedia
 Eisenberg, Das geistige Wien, 1893, p. 158

External links
 Heinrich Glücksmann at us.imdb.com
 GLÜCKSMANN, Heinrich (Pseud. Fortunatus) at ezines.onb.ac.at:8080

References

1864 births
1947 deaths
People from Moravský Krumlov
People from the Margraviate of Moravia
Austro-Hungarian Jews
Argentine people of Czech-Jewish descent
Austrian male writers
Jewish Argentine writers